The Grammy Award for Best Male Country Vocal Performance was awarded between 1965 and 2011. The award has had several minor name changes:

From 1965 to 1967 the award was known as Best Country & Western Vocal Performance - Male
In 1968 it was awarded as Best Country & Western Solo Vocal Performance, Male 
From 1969 to 1994 it was awarded as Best Country Vocal Performance, Male
From 1995 to 2011 it was awarded as Best Male Country Vocal Performance

The award was discontinued after the 2011 awards season in a major overhaul of Grammy categories. From 2012, all solo performances (male, female and instrumental) in the country category will be shifted to the newly formed Best Country Solo Performance category.

Years reflect the year in which the Grammy Awards were presented, for works released in the previous year.

Recipients

References

Grammy Awards for country music
Grammy Award for Best Male Country Vocal Performance winners